UWL may refer to:

Ultimate Wrestling Israel
University of West London
University of Wisconsin–La Crosse
Upper Warlingham railway station, Surrey, England (National Rail station code UWL)